Frederick Steele Miller Murray (20 August 1871 – 5 August 1952) was a New Zealand rugby union player. A forward, Murray represented  at a provincial level, and was a member of the New Zealand national side in 1893 and 1897. He played 20 matches for New Zealand, but did not appear in any internationals as New Zealand did not play its first Test match until 1903.

References

1871 births
1952 deaths
New Zealand rugby union players
New Zealand international rugby union players
Auckland rugby union players
Rugby union forwards